Milk Colony is a small layout situated in Malleswaram in Bangalore. Milk Colony gets its name from the profession of the community who settled down there during the 1960s. Most of the people are working class. People here speak predominantly Kannada.

Location 
Milk colony is bordered with Yeshwantpur, Malleswaram and Rajajinagar. It is situated next to the majestic Brigade Gateway. ISKCON Sri Radha Krishna temple is the nearest place of attraction. Yeshwantpur and Malleswaram are the nearest railway stations.

The erstwhile Raja Mill (Now Mantri Greens is built at this plot) workers were given houses at this place and was called Raja Mill Colony, which later on was shortened to Milk colony. If the older gazettes or the older property papers mention it as Krishnrajawodeyar Mill' colony.

There is a big sports field in the Milk Colony. 

Neighbourhoods in Bangalore